Sandy Creek Bridge is a covered bridge spanning Sandy Creek near the community of Remote in southwestern Oregon in the United States. The bridge crosses the creek near its mouth on the Middle Fork Coquille River in Coos County.

Built in 1921, the bridge carried Oregon Route 42 over the creek until bypassed by a newer bridge in 1949. In 1984, after restoration by volunteers from the Lions Club of Myrtle Point, the structure became a display in a county park at the same site. It is the only remaining covered bridge in Coos County.

Special features of the bridge include large side openings and a truss made of two crossed Howe truss members on each chord. It was added the National Register of Historic Places in 1979.

See also
 List of bridges on the National Register of Historic Places in Oregon
 List of Oregon covered bridges

References

External links

Bridges completed in 1921
Buildings and structures in Coos County, Oregon
Covered bridges on the National Register of Historic Places in Oregon
Pedestrian bridges in Oregon
Tourist attractions in Coos County, Oregon
Wooden bridges in Oregon
National Register of Historic Places in Coos County, Oregon
Road bridges on the National Register of Historic Places in Oregon
Former road bridges in the United States